Oscar Osvaldo Calics (born 18 November 1939) is an Argentine football midfielder who played for Argentina in the 1966 World Cup. He also played for Banfield and San Lorenzo. He was manager in San Lorenzo and in Talleres de Remedios de Escalada.

References

External links
FIFA profile

1939 births
Living people
Argentine footballers
Argentina international footballers
Association football midfielders
San Lorenzo de Almagro footballers
1966 FIFA World Cup players
Talleres de Remedios de Escalada managers
Atlético Nacional footballers
Argentine Primera División players
Primera Nacional players
Categoría Primera A players
Argentine expatriate footballers
Expatriate footballers in Colombia
Argentine football managers
Footballers from Buenos Aires